Pisodonophis is a genus of eels in the snake eel family Ophichthidae. It currently contains the following species:

 Pisodonophis boro (F. Hamilton, 1822) (rice-paddy eel)
 Pisodonophis cancrivorus (J. Richardson, 1848) (longfin snake-eel)
 Pisodonophis copelandi Herre, 1953
 Pisodonophis daspilotus C. H. Gilbert, 1898 (marble-toothed snake-eel)
 Pisodonophis hijala (F. Hamilton, 1822)
 Pisodonophis hoeveni (Bleeker, 1853) (Hoeven's snake-eel)
 Pisodonophis hypselopterus (Bleeker, 1851)
 Pisodonophis sangjuensis H. S. Ji & J. K. Kim, 2011 (Korean snake-eel)
 Pisodonophis semicinctus (J. Richardson, 1848)

Pisodonophis boro is an endemic fish in Vietnam's coastal region, it is also found in the paddy fields of the Hải Phòng area of Vietnam, where the small fry are known as cá nhệch, "nhệch fish," and are eaten in a local salad, gỏi nhệch.

References

 

Ophichthidae
Fish of Bangladesh
Fish of Vietnam
Freshwater fish of Asia